The men's 4 × 400 metres relay at the 2014 IAAF World Indoor Championships took place on 8 and 9 March.

Records

Schedule

Results

Heats
Qualification: First 2 in each heat (Q) and the next 2 fastest (q) qualified for the final.

Final

References

Relay 4x400 metres
4 × 400 metres relay at the World Athletics Indoor Championships